Jani Galik (born 9 October 1984 in Přerov, Czechoslovakia) is a Czech football player who plays midfielder for the Bradenton Academics in the USL Premier Development League.

Although born in Czechoslovakia, Galik grew up in Sarasota, Florida. After high school, he committed to play college soccer at Florida Atlantic University but never followed through.  Instead he attended the IMG Academy in Bradenton where he played two years with the Bradenton Academics, scoring 1 goal in 30 appearances.

On 1 April 2006 he signed a developmental contract with the New England Revolution, but was waived at the end of the season after playing just two games. He signed for Harrisburg City Islanders in 2007, and made 5 appearances in the Islanders' championship-winning season, before returning to Bradenton. He retired on July 1, 2017.

External links
 Revolutionsoccer.net player bio

References 

1984 births
Living people
Sportspeople from Přerov
IMG Academy Bradenton players
Czech footballers
New England Revolution players
Penn FC players
Major League Soccer players
USL Second Division players
USL League Two players
Association football midfielders